Nathan Blockley (born 15 June 1992) is a Scottish footballer who plays as a midfielder for Scottish League One side Stenhousemuir.

Blockley started his career as a youth player with Glasgow side Queen's Park. In 2011, he signed a contract with Airdrie United. At the end of the 2014–15 season, Blockley was released after four years with The Diamonds., signing for Peterhead in July 2015.

Career statistics

References

External links
 
 Nathan Blockley at Airdrieonians

1992 births
Living people
Scottish footballers
Queen's Park F.C. players
Airdrieonians F.C. players
Peterhead F.C. players
Stenhousemuir F.C. players
Scottish Football League players
Scottish Professional Football League players
Association football midfielders